The Best of Celine Dion & David Foster is a compilation album by Canadian singer Celine Dion, released by Sony Music Entertainment in selected Asian countries on 19 October 2012. It features songs produced by Grammy Award-winning musician, record producer and songwriter, David Foster, including previously unreleased "If I Can Dream" (duet with Elvis Presley).

Content
This Asia exclusive release celebrates twenty years of partnership between Celine Dion and David Foster. The album was released in countries like Philippines, Malaysia, Hong Kong, Taiwan, Indonesia, Thailand, South Korea and China. It includes hits like "Because You Loved Me," "The Power of Love," "All by Myself," "Tell Him" (duet with Barbra Streisand) and "To Love You More," and previously unreleased duet with Elvis Presley on "If I Can Dream". The latter track was recorded for Idol Gives Back and Dion performed it with Presley (together on stage with use of rotoscoping) on American Idol on 25 April 2007. The Best of Celine Dion & David Foster also contains duets with Andrea Bocelli, Frank Sinatra, Luciano Pavarotti and Clive Griffin. Three songs included here were featured in films: "Because You Loved Me" in Up Close & Personal, "When I Fall in Love" in Sleepless in Seattle and "The Prayer" in Quest for Camelot. However, the album does not include any song from Unison (1990), where Foster produced five tracks. The cover photo was taken from an exclusive session with Dion and Foster at the Caesars Palace in Las Vegas in October 2005, made by photographer Jerry Metellus for the NUVO magazine.

Track listing

Notes
  signifies Italian translation
  signifies a co-producer

Charts

Release history

References

External links

2012 compilation albums
Albums produced by Babyface (musician)
Albums produced by David Foster
Albums produced by Humberto Gatica
Albums produced by Walter Afanasieff
Celine Dion compilation albums